= Regions and provinces of Belgium =

Regions and provinces of Belgium may refer to:

- Provinces of Belgium
- Communities, regions and language areas of Belgium
